John Spillane (born 1961) is a singer-songwriter from Cork, Ireland.

Background 
Spillane grew up in the Cork suburb of Wilton, in a family of five boys. He was educated in Coláiste an Spioraid Naoimh, Bishopstown. Raised by his mother, she influenced his musical nature and taught him a variety of Cork songs including "The Banks of My Own Lovely Lee" and "The Lonely Woods of Upton". A shy child who shunned the spotlight, he got his first guitar at the age of fifteen and joined his first band in school. When he first began his main influences derived from artists like the Beatles, Neil Young, Planxty and Bob Dylan. His beginnings were more rock than anything else until he had a change of heart.

"When I started out with rock bands, I sang in an American accent. Then I heard real Americans sing the blues and it made me feel like a fraud. Ever since then, the most important thing for me is to be true to who I am and where I come from."

After finishing the leaving cert he took a hiatus to briefly work as a clerk in the Bank of Ireland, but his old band lured him back to his real calling, music. He hopped in a van with his band 'Sabre' and toured around Ireland playing rock music. It all fell apart according to Spillane but it was no matter as at that point he had realised that trad was what he really wanted to immerse himself in and began his career as a professional musician at the age of 20.

Musical collaborations and beginnings 
In Spillane's early career he was involved with several bands but most notably were Nomos and The Stargazers. Taken under the wing of renowned whistle player Noel Shine, Spillane spent several years playing with the local jazz vocal group The Stargazers. It was at this time he studied in UCC obtaining a degree in Irish and English.

It was in 1992 when the young trad band Nomos changed Spillane's life. The band was made up of concertina player Niall Vallely, Donegal fiddler Liz Doherty (replaced by Cork fiddle player Vince Milne on the second album), bodhrán player Frank Torpey, and Gerry McKee on mandocello and bouzouki. Spillane played acoustic guitar and fretless electric bass while also contributing songs to the group. Together they toured the world and produces two albums Set You Free and I Won't Be Afraid Anymore. Spillane then left to pursue a solo career.

Celebration of the Irish language 

Spillane is an advocate of the resurgence of the Irish language having released two albums almost entirely in Irish. The first being a collaboration with Irish poet Louis de Paor under the pseudonym "The Gaelic Hit Factory". The album of the same name was critically acclaimed and Spillane and De Paor combined their talents to win the Realta Irish song contest two years in a row. The second being the recent double platinum selling album Irish Songs We Learned at School which was recorded with students from a school in Ballincollig and features thirteen traditional Irish songs. Spillane is noted to have followed the release (and continues to do so) with a school tour to promote the Irish language through music to young people.  A song from the album was featured on the 2013 compilation album Larry Kirwan's Celtic Invasion.

Spillane in Africa 
In October 2007 asked by TG4, Spillane filmed a twelve-day musical visit to Senegal in West Africa. It was part of a series called Ceoilchuairt which sent different musicians to different parts of the world to interact with musicians from different cultures and learn from them.

An excerpt from his journal describes an experience from that trip:
"Another day found us on the Isle de Goréé, the chief station for the deportation of slaves from West Africa to the Americas. A World Heritage Site and a museum to the appalling history of man's inhumanity to man.
"If all the sea were ink, and all the sky were made of paper, there would not be enough ink or paper to write down the human suffering caused by the Slave Trade."
The show itself was repeated due to its popularity and Spillane has since collaborated with TG4 on a documentary about emigration.

Instruments 
Spillane has said that "my most treasured possession is my Spanish guitar, a Cabballero by Rodruigez, Guitarra de Artisania, Almansa, Espana".

Discography 
 The Wells of the World (1997)
 Will We Be Brilliant or What? (2002)
 Hey Dreamer (2005)
 The Gaelic Hit Factory (2006)
 My Dark Rosaleen & the Island of Dreams (2008)
 Irish Songs We Learned at School (2008)
 More Irish Songs We Learned in School (2009)
 Rock to Cling to (2011)
 Life In An Irish Town (2013)
 The Man Who Came in from the Dark (2014)
 100 Snow White Horses (2021)

Awards

Meteor Awards 

|-
| 2003 || || Best Folk/Traditional Act || 
|-
| rowspan="2" | 2006 || rowspan="2" | || Best Trad and Folk || 
|-
| Best Irish Male || 
|-
| 2009 || || Best Traditional/Folk || 
|}

References

External links 
Spillane's home page
Spillane's MySpace page
Spillane's Bandcamp page

1961 births
Living people
Irish folk musicians
Musicians from Cork (city)